The county courts are the state of Florida's trial courts, and are of general jurisdiction.  There is a county court in each of Florida's 67 counties.

These courts have jurisdiction to try criminal cases classified as misdemeanors, civil actions where the amount in controversy is less than $30,000 ($50,000 on January 1, 2023), small claims cases (less than $8,000), landlord and tenant disputes and other miscellaneous actions.

Where there are no municipal courts, county courts handle traffic citations. Parking tickets are handled by the municipality. The ticket recipient is responsible for paying the ticket.

County court decisions may be appealed to the Florida District Courts of Appeal, as set forth in Florida Rule of Appellate Procedure 9.030.

References

Florida state courts
Courts and tribunals with year of establishment missing